Archibald Williams Hall (December 21, 1908 – April 28, 1978), known as Arch was an American actor and filmmaker, best known for making a series of B-movies made in the early 1960s starring his son, Arch Hall Jr. Hall used various names throughout his career including Nicholas Merriwether, William Waters, and Archie Hall.

Early life and career
Hall was born in St. Louis, Missouri and grew up in South Dakota as a genuine cowboy. Hall spoke the Sioux language and had a Sioux name, "Waa-toe-gala Oak-Shilla" (translation: Wild Boy).

Hall graduated from the University of South Dakota, wrote for radio, interviewing elderly Native Americans on KOTA, and was a pilot in the United States Army Air Forces. Hall's experience in the Air Force was satirized in The Last Time I Saw Archie, a 1961 film by Bill Bowers which starred Jack Webb, Robert Mitchum, and France Nuyen. The film was loosely based on Hall's experience in the army after being declared to be too old to fly fighters, but too inexperienced to fly bombers, leaving his only option to fly troop transport gliders.

Hall then worked as a stuntman in Hollywood in the 1930s, a job which expanded into small acting roles in various films, usually Westerns. Hall formed his own movie studio, Fairway Productions, in Burbank, California. In the early 1960s, Fairway Productions made a series of B-films targeted towards the drive-in market, and were later hailed as some of the worst films ever made. They starred himself, his son Arch Jr., and his wife Addalyn, who would appear as a background extra or character actor. The sound was handled by Arch Jr. and his friend from high school, Alan O'Day, who later rose to notoriety as a writer of hit pop songs in the 1970s.

Personal life
Hall married Addalyn Faye Pollitt (born June 5, 1906) who worked with Hall as a staff writer in Hall's radio days. During World War II, Addalyn was a Navy Inspector at Lockheed Aircraft. They had one child, Arch Hall Jr., born in 1943.

Death
Hall died of a heart attack on April 28, 1978, in Los Angeles, and was buried with honors in a Sioux funeral in Philip, South Dakota. The service was presided over by the Lakota Sioux spiritual leader Frank Fools Crow.

Hall's life and times are extensively discussed in the 51-page interview with Arch Hall Jr. that appears in the 2005 book Earth vs. the Sci-Fi Filmmakers, by Tom Weaver, which was published by McFarland & Co. in North Carolina.

Filmography

Sources
Earth vs. the Sci-Fi Filmmakers, a book by Tom Weaver,  published by McFarland & Co. in North Carolina.

References

 Arch Hall Sr. biography & filmography
 Behind the Scenes: It Stars With a Cowboy

External links

 
 

1908 births
1978 deaths
American male film actors
Film producers from California
American film directors
American male screenwriters
Male actors from St. Louis
Male actors from Los Angeles
United States Army Air Forces officers
University of South Dakota alumni
Male Western (genre) film actors
United States Army Air Forces pilots of World War II
20th-century American male actors
20th-century American businesspeople
Screenwriters from Missouri
Screenwriters from California
20th-century American male writers
20th-century American screenwriters